A performance surface is a flooring suitable for dance or sport. Performance surfaces are normally laid on top of, or are part of, a sprung floor to produce a complete dance floor or sports floor.

Dance performance surfaces made of sheet vinyl are also called dance floors and marley floors. They are called marley-type floors from a very popular reversible vinyl flooring manufactured for years until about 1978 by Marley Floors Ltd.

Theatres often have a number of roll-out floors with different characteristics to satisfy the requirements of different forms of dance.

This article deals mainly with the customization of a floor for different activities by the use of different surfaces. The sprung floor article deals with the basic requirements and construction of floors to make them suitable for dance and indoor sports.

Requirements 

The sprung floor article outlines some of the different standards with regards to the performance surface of a sports floor. Below are some of the key factors that can influence the performance surface required within a sports facility.
 Shock absorption: The amount of an impact that is absorbed by the floor (Usually measured in %)
 Vertical deformation: The average distance the floor deforms under impact (Usually measured in mm)
 Rolling load: If the floor can withstand a weighted trolley being wheeled across the surface (A set weight is defined and the outcome is usually yes/no or pass/fail)
 Ball rebound: How much a ball bounces off the surface compared to what it would when being bounced on a concrete surface (Measured as a % against the bounce on a concrete surface)
 Slip resistance: The level of grip the surface has (Measurements vary depending on standards)

A sprung floor with a hard surface provides protection from serious injuries rather than minor injuries. A fall can still cause bruises. A soft performance surface on the other hand can provide protection from minor injuries but not serious injuries. Providing sufficient protection from serious injury for adults using a thick performance surface alone would render it unsuitable for most dance or sport. This is because a performance surface is point elastic whereas area elasticity as provided by a sprung floor is mainly preferred.

Traction 

In general, dance requires less traction than gym. However a floor should not of itself be very slippery or sticky. DIN 18032 defines a range of traction which should suit most activities. These type of floors should also be smooth, and a slide should not cause carpet burn. This means it is difficult to stop them from becoming slippery when wet.

Most of the differences between the different disciplines can and should be catered for by the use of appropriate shoes. On the same surface, a dance shoe with a leather or suede sole will give much less traction than a gym shoe with a composite rubber sole. A sticky floor used for gym is very likely to cause twisted ankles, and a slippery floor used for dancing is liable to cause bad falls.

Everyday footwear nowadays tends to have a higher traction. For occasions like weddings, where the dancers may not have proper footwear, a slightly slippier floor could compensate somewhat, but a highly polished floor can be very dangerous with leather soles. Both gyms and dance clubs are better off  providing good safe floors and encouraging the use of proper footwear.

Performance surface construction 

The performance surface is normally of vinyl or hardwood, engineered wood or laminate. For dance the surface may be replaceable so for instance a theatre can adapt easily to either ballet or tap dance, these are normally made of vinyl sheeting. Hardwood is however preferred for tap dance. Some sports have extra requirements like spike resistance or a standard ball bounce.

Roll-up vinyl sheeting normally consists of:

 A thin top wear layer that also has UV light protection. Ultraviolet light rapidly degrades vinyl. This layer has to provide the proper traction and tends to be matte rather than shiny as for domestic vinyl.
 A layer of vinyl which supports the wear layer. This also provides the main colour.
 A woven fibre interlayer. This stops the floor deforming and also provides some area elasticity.
 A bottom layer of foamed vinyl which provides the softness.

When rolled up the vinyl should not be bent sharply - it should be on rolls. When there are a number of different surfaces for a hall these can be kept on special storage carts which keep them separate rather than lying on each other.

What makes a good performance surface 

A wood surface is ideal for social dancing if maintained properly and is also standard for many indoor sports. Engineered wood is normally used nowadays for wood flooring as it is less liable to warp or shrink and is more economic. Tap dance is especially punishing and a tough hardwood surface like oak or maple is preferred for any regular use.

Vinyl is a better choice for other types of dance or more general community use. The requirements for different types of dance are different, but the differences can mostly be accommodated by changes in the dance surface. For instance Riverdance requires a harder surface that makes a sound, Ballet requires a softer surface because of the high jumps and possibility of falls. Ballroom dancing requires less traction than Scottish country dancing.

It used to be difficult to maintain a wood floor properly. However, if the directions of the floor manufacturer are followed properly modern treatments will maintain a good surface. It is important not to just trust a commercial office cleaner to know how to do a good job, they should be instructed to follow the directions. There are no cheap and foolproof machines around for measuring traction which would enable cleaners to see their work conforms to dance or sports requirements.  Thus there is a very strong inclination for managers or cleaners to go for other requirements e.g. a shiny surface or one that resists dirt better.

If a floor is occasionally used for public events, e.g. a gym hall used for a graduation ceremony, then a gym floor cover can be used to protect the floor and ease the normal requirements.

To maintain good traction it is important to stop the floor getting dirty or even slightly wet. A good floor cleaning regime and insisting on sports or dance shoes will help with this. The main protection though is to ensure the hall has industrial grade barrier matting at the entrance. The building should also have a floor grate at the entrance.

References

Dance equipment
Dance and health
Floors
Sports equipment